Powder Mill Pond is a  impoundment on the Contoocook River in Hillsborough County in southern New Hampshire, United States. The pond's dam is located in the town of Bennington, with water impounded into the towns of Hancock and Greenfield.

The lake is classified as a warmwater fishery, with observed species including smallmouth and largemouth bass, chain pickerel, horned pout, black crappie, and bluegill.

See also

List of lakes in New Hampshire

References

Lakes of Hillsborough County, New Hampshire
Hancock, New Hampshire
Greenfield, New Hampshire